B'nai Abraham or B'Nai Abraham  (Hebrew for "Sons/Children of Abraham") may refer to the following Jewish synagogues:
 B'nai Abraham Synagogue (Virginia, Minnesota)
 Temple B'Nai Abraham (Newark, New Jersey)
 Historic Congregation B'nai Abraham (Philadelphia, Pennsylvania)
 B'nai Abraham Synagogue (Brenham, Texas)

See also